Krissann Barretto is an Indian television actress and model known for playing Alya Saxena in Kaisi Yeh Yaariaan and participating in Ace of Space 2.

Early life
Barretto attended the Apostolic Carmel High School in Bandra, Mumbai and St. Xavier's College, Mumbai. She then attended the Government Law College, Mumbai but dropped out to pursue a career in acting.

Career
Barretto started off her television career by acting in episodics like Heroes, The Fightback Files and Yeh Hai Aashiqui. She got her breakthrough in 2014 with MTV India's Kaisi Yeh Yaariyan where she portrayed Alya Saxena. In 2016, she played Kiya Kapoor in &TV's Kahani Hamari...Dil Dosti Deewanepan Ki and Tapasya in MTV India's Girls on Top. From 2016 to 2017, she played Romi in Star Plus's Ishqbaaaz.

In 2017, she made her digital debut playing Sarah in ALT Balaji's Class of 2017 and Payal in CyberSquad. From 2017 to 2018, she portrayed Sanjana Bhardwaj in Colors TV's Sasural Simar Ka. In 2018, she played Rangoli Rai in Tu Aashiqui. In 2019, Barretto participated in MTV India's Ace Of Space 2 where she finished as a fourth runner up. In June 2022, she participated in MTV India's reality show MTV Ex Or Next.

Television

Web series

References

External links

Indian television actresses
Living people
Indian VJs (media personalities)
1991 births
21st-century Indian actresses
Actresses in Hindi television